USSES is an acronym which may refer to:

 University Statisticians of the Southern Experiment Stations
 the U.S. Sheep Experiment Station
 the Usses (river), a tributary of the Rhône in Haute-Savoie, France